Sasha Cooke is an American mezzo-soprano.

Cooke was born in Riverside, California, and grew up in College Station, Texas, where her parents are professors of Russian at Texas A&M University. She earned a bachelor's degree from Rice University and trained at the Juilliard School in New York. Cooke attended the Music Academy of the West in 2002.

Cooke won best opera recording for Doctor Atomic at the 54th Annual Grammy Awards, 2011, and again for The (R)evolution of Steve Jobs at the 61st Annual Grammy Awards, 2018. 

In 2022, she played Thirza in Houston Grand Opera's staging of The Wreckers by Ethel Smyth.

References

External links
Sasha Cooke at Operabase

Living people
American mezzo-sopranos
Rice University alumni
Juilliard School alumni
American operatic sopranos
21st-century American women opera singers
People from Riverside, California
People from College Station, Texas
Year of birth missing (living people)
Music Academy of the West alumni
Singers from California
Classical musicians from California
Singers from Texas
Classical musicians from Texas